Gnathacmaeops pratensis is a species of beetle in the family Cerambycidae, the only species in the genus Gnathacmaeops.

References

Lepturinae